Lebia abdita is a species of beetle in the family Carabidae. It is found in Baja California, Arizona and Mexico.

References

Further reading

 
 
 
 

Lebia
Beetles described in 1967